Carlo Ercole Bosoni (1826-1887) was an Italian composer and conductor. He was active as a conductor at La Fenice in Venice during the 1850s and 1870s. Some of his operas premiered there as well.

References

1826 births
1887 deaths
Italian classical composers
Italian male classical composers
Italian conductors (music)
Italian male conductors (music)
Italian opera composers
Male opera composers
19th-century classical composers
19th-century conductors (music)
19th-century Italian composers